Kumane may refer to:

 Kumane, Novi Bečej, a village in Vojvodina, Serbia
 Kumane, Veliko Gradište, a village in eastern Serbia
 Kumane, Istočni Stari Grad, a village in Bosnia and Herzegovina

See also 
 Kumani (disambiguation)